Transport Company of the City of Pardubice (Dopravní podnik města Pardubic a.s., DPmP a.s.) is a transport company owned by the city of Pardubice, Czech Republic. Under various names, the company has existed since 1950.

Bus transport in the Czech Republic
Transport companies established in 1950
Pardubice